Mads Sjøgård Pettersen (born 21 January 1984) is a Norwegian actor known for his role of Fredrik Kayser on mini-series The Heavy Water War and for his portrayal of Håvard Bakkeli on the series Nobel.

Career 
In 2009 he portrayed Thomas in the film North (in Norwegian: Nord). In 2012 he was part of the cast of the mini-series Erobreren where he portrayed young Axel. In 2015 he played the role of Fredrik Kayser, a resistance member, in The Heavy Water War (in Norwegian: "Kampen om tungtvannet"). In 2016 he portrayed Håvard Bakkeli in Nobel. In 2017 he portrayed Per in the film Askeladden - I Dovregubbens Hall.

Filmography

TV series

Film

Theater

Awards

References 

Living people
20th-century Norwegian male actors
21st-century Norwegian male actors
Norwegian male film actors
Norwegian male stage actors
Norwegian male television actors
Norwegian male voice actors
People from Sørfold
1984 births